Berkeley County Schools is the operating school district within Berkeley County, West Virginia. It is headquartered in the county seat of Martinsburg.

Board of Education 
Berkeley County Schools is governed by the Berkeley County Board of Education, made up of the following elected members:
Patrick Murphy, President
Jacqueline Long, Vice President
Michael Martin
Melissa Power
Damon Wright

Schools

High Schools 
Hedgesville High School , Hedgesville
Martinsburg High School , Martinsburg
Musselman High School , Inwood
Spring Mills High School , Martinsburg

Middle Schools 
Hedgesville Middle School, Hedgesville
Martinsburg North Middle School, Martinsburg
Martinsburg South Middle School, Martinsburg
Mountain Ridge Middle School, Gerrardstown
Musselman Middle School, Bunker Hill
Spring Mills Middle School, Martinsburg

Intermediate Schools (3-5) 
Eagle School Intermediate, Martinsburg
Mill Creek Intermediate School, Bunker Hill
Mountain Ridge Intermediate School, Gerrardstown
Orchard View Intermediate School, Martinsburg
Potomack Intermediate School, Martinsburg
Tomahawk Intermediate School, Hedgesville

Elementary/Primary Schools (PreK-2) 
Back Creek Valley Elementary School, Hedgesville
Bedington Elementary School, Martinsburg
Berkeley Heights Elementary School, Martinsburg
Bunker Hill Elementary School, Bunker Hill
Burke Street Elementary School, Martinsburg
Gerrardstown Elementary School, Gerrardstown
Hedgesville Elementary School, Hedgesville
Inwood Primary School, Inwood
Marlowe Elementary School , Falling Waters
Opequon Elementary School, Martinsburg
Rosemont Elementary School, Martinsburg
Spring Mills Primary School, Martinsburg
Tuscarora Elementary School, Martinsburg
Valley View Elementary School, Martinsburg
Winchester Avenue Elementary School, Martinsburg

References

External links 
Berkeley County Schools

School districts in West Virginia
Education in Berkeley County, West Virginia